Alejandra García Flood (born June 13, 1973) is an Argentine pole vaulter.

Career
Her personal best jump is 4.43 metres, which she achieved in April 2004 in Santa Fe. This is the current Argentine record, and was a South American record until 2005. She is a former high jumper, winning silver at the 1993 South American Championships. In 2000 and 2010 she won the Konex Award Merit Diploma as one of the five best Atletes from each decade in Argentina.

Competition record

References

External links 
 
 

1973 births
Living people
Argentine female pole vaulters
Argentine female long jumpers
Argentine female high jumpers
Argentine heptathletes
Athletes (track and field) at the 2000 Summer Olympics
Athletes (track and field) at the 2004 Summer Olympics
Athletes (track and field) at the 2008 Summer Olympics
Athletes (track and field) at the 1995 Pan American Games
Athletes (track and field) at the 1999 Pan American Games
Athletes (track and field) at the 2003 Pan American Games
Athletes (track and field) at the 2007 Pan American Games
Athletes (track and field) at the 2011 Pan American Games
Olympic athletes of Argentina
Athletes from Buenos Aires
Pan American Games medalists in athletics (track and field)
Pan American Games gold medalists for Argentina
South American Games gold medalists for Argentina
South American Games medalists in athletics
Competitors at the 1998 South American Games
Medalists at the 1999 Pan American Games
20th-century Argentine women
21st-century Argentine women